The Salpa Line (literally Latch line), or its official name, Suomen Salpa (Finland's Latch), is a bunker line on the eastern border of Finland. It was built in 1940–1941 during the Interim Peace between the Winter War and the Continuation War and further in 1944 to defend Finland against a possible Soviet invasion.

The line is 1,200 kilometres long, stretching from the Gulf of Finland to Petsamo (now Pechenga, Russia). It never saw military action because the Soviet offensive in 1944 was stopped at the VKT-line on the Karelian Isthmus. The fortifications of the Salpa Line were significantly more complete and stronger than those of the Mannerheim Line.

Construction
The planning of the Salpa Line was commissioned by general Rudolf Walden and the construction began at the end of the Winter War in 1940. At first, volunteers worked there—then people ineligible for the war service were mobilized. The maximum number of workers, on site was near 35,000 in the spring of 1941. After the beginning of the Continuation War on 25 June 1941 the fortification work was stopped, pillboxes and bunkers were stripped of armaments, which were sent to the front. As the tide of the conflict turned, and the front began to approach the prewar Finnish borders in early 1944, the work on the Salpa Line resumed and continued until the end of the Continuation War on 4 September 1944.

Line composition and terrain
728 various concrete installations, 315 km of wire obstacles, 225 km of anti-tank obstacles, 130 km of anti-tank ditches, more than 3,000 entrenchments, 254 concrete infantry shelters, trenches, rifleman's cells and dugouts composed the power and strength of this defence line. The line even employed old 11 and 9 inch coastal mortars from the late 19th century, due to unavailability of more modern artillery.

Numerous lakes, marshes and small rocks were also incorporated in the defence line. For example, the Lake Saimaa area is a labyrinth of lakes of varying sizes, islands, straits and rivers, making the area very easy to defend. 90% of all the concrete installations of the Salpa Line were on the line between the Gulf of Finland and the Lake Saimaa waterway system. This part, as the original post-Winter War defence line, was also referred with the name "Luumäki-Suomenlahti-linja" (Luumäki-Gulf of Finland line) or simply as "Luumäen linja" (Lake Saimaa is situated north of Luumäki).

Impact on the war
The fortifications were never used in combat because the Red Army was stopped at the end of the Continuation War well before its advance units reached Salpa (see Battle of Tali-Ihantala). The line was partially manned with old reservists in the summer of 1944. The existence of the fortified line was an advantage for the Finns in the subsequent peace talks.

Present day
The remains of the decommissioned line serve as a tourist attraction. On the southernmost part of the Salpa Line is located the Salpa Line Museum (Salpa linja -museo) that was founded in 1987 by the Miehikkälä municipality and the Second World War veteran organisations.

Gallery

Maps

Kymenlaakso and South Karelia

Built-up cultural environments of national importance refers to the official classification of The National Board of Antiquities of Finland.

Southern Savonia

North Karelia

History
Some of the Salpa Line objects dates back to the Winter War. In Lieksa "Viisikon Salpalinja etusema" was started to be built already during the pre-Winter War extra military training period . The name "Viisikko" refers to the name of the village and can be translated as "The Five". The other names of the village are Hattuvaara (of Lieksa) or just Hattu (a Hat). The battles in Hattu are related to the battles of Lieksa from the very first war day, 30 November 1939 to 27 December 1939. The Soviet forces attacked against the Viisikko positions on 9 December 1939 and it had to start to withdraw on Christmas Day.

The other place where there have been battles during the Winter War was in the Änänkäinen and Puuruu lake areas. On the very first war day, the Soviet troops tried to capture the Kiviranta border control post just after 7 o'clock in the morning, but the prepared and reinforced Finnish border troops succeeded in slowing the speed of the attacking forces and only by the evening the Finnish border troops had withdrawn to Äninkäinen position, where the positions of the 13th separate battalion were. The Finnish counter-attack took place the next day, 1 December 1939. The 13th separate battalion was assisted by the 12th separate battalion, which had come to the place. Both the battalions attacked until the Soviet troops stopped them on the crossroad of Hattuselkonen. Then 12th separate battalion occupied the Änänkäinen position, while the 13th battalion was withdrawing driven by the Soviet troops to the Nurmijärvi of Lieksa. The Laklajoki position was missed almost without a fight. The delay action actually started only 2 December. The Soviet troops started harassing with artillery fire on 3 December and continued to do so for five days. In the first days of December also in Kuhmo the Sivakka road-crossing was lost in Kuhmo, which made it possible for the Soviet troops to go the Nurmijärvi of Lieksa to the back side of the Aninkäinen defenders.

The 13th separate battalion hold the positions and the 12th separate battalion was ordered to withdraw to Puuruu to reinforce the next possible defence position about four kilometres back. The mortars of the 12th battalion were left to reinforce those of the 13th battalion.

In four days, 7 December, the Soviet troops succeeded to take the front positions of the Finnish troops making it hard for the 12th battalion to keep its positions in Änänkäinen region. The same day the Finns destroyed a big Soviet patrol and learned, that the Soviet infantry regiment 529 will cover the southern side of the attacking Soviet division 54, which was to go to Kuhmo. The reinforced 529th regiment consisted of 6,000 soldiers added by 40 cannons and 20 tanks. The idea had been to occupy Lieksa in the independence day of Finland and then go to Nurmes 10 December and then towards Kajaani. The main target was Oulu on the West coast of Finland to cut the country into two halves.

On 8 December 13 separate battalion was allowed to withdraw from Änäkäinen to Nurmijärvi through Puuruu positions. Delaying by almost a week the Soviet troops in front of Änäkäinen provided time for building the new positions in Puuruu.

Places

Other
Near Puuruu lake there is a memorial plate attached on the granite stone with the text "TÄÄLLÄ TAISTELTIIN 9-25.12.1939" ("The fights went on here from 9 to 25 December 1939") to commemorate the Lieksa battles.

Kainuu and Northern Ostrobothnia

Lapland

See also
 VT-line
 VKT-line

References

External links

 Salpa Line museum
 Salpa Centre
 Salpa Line on the Northern Fortress

World War II defensive lines
Winter War
Continuation War